Microcolona toropis is a moth of the family Elachistidae. It is found in Australia, where it has been recorded from Western Australia.

The wingspan is about 9 mm. The head and thorax are whitish, the antennae grey and the abdomen grey-whitish. The forewings are ochreous-whitish, slightly fuscous-sprinkled. The hindwings are light grey. Adults have been recorded in October.

References

Microcolona
Moths described in 1897
Moths of Australia